Willis Franklin Overton, Jr. is an American psychologist whose research is in the fields of clinical and developmental psychology. He is the Thaddeus L. Bolton Professor of Psychology Emeritus at Temple University, where he was the chair of the psychology department from 2000 to 2006. He is a fellow of the American Psychological Association's Divisions 7 (Developmental Psychology), 12 (Clinical Psychology), and 20 (Adult Development & Aging). He was formerly the president of the Jean Piaget Society and the Society for the Study of Human Development.

References

External links
Faculty page
Faculty website

Living people
People from Norwalk, Connecticut
Boston University alumni
Clark University alumni
Temple University faculty
American developmental psychologists
Year of birth missing (living people)
American clinical psychologists